Kid Chan (born 15 January 1978) is a wedding photojournalist, portrait and celebrity photographer from Malaysia.

Life and career
Born and raised in Kuala Lumpur, the capital of Malaysia, Chan attended the Sri Cempaka school before pursuing a degree in international business from the Curtin University of Technology in Perth, Australia. He began working in the corporate world as an executive assistant before taking up photography as his exclusive job. After two years in his position, Chan left his position to take up an apprenticeship at a photography studio.

In 2000, he took over Portrait One, a company he renamed "Kid Chan Studio". In the beginning, Chan concentrated on corporate photography and photographed his clients' children's weddings. He has since photographed royalty, politicians, artists, celebrities and the weddings of Asian celebrities. He was the official photographer for the Royal wedding of Tengku Aslahuddin Jaa'far and Sofia Erica Lane, and was featured in the cover of Harper's Bazaar.

In 2010, his photo collection of three cancer survivors and their families was exhibited in 50 Courts Malaysia's stores nationwide as part of an exhibition to raise funds for the National Cancer Society of Malaysia (NCSM) through its "Hope for Our Children" campaign. In the same year, he also photographed the shooting of Britain's Next Top Model Cycle 6 in episode 11, which was filmed in Kuala Lumpur. In 2012, he was appointed the ambassador for MenCare.

Book
In 2013, Chan published the book Kid Chan's Guide to the Business of Photography (MPH, 2013), which covers setting up a photography business from a Malaysian perspective.

Accolades
Chan was named by Malaysian Tatler as "one of the 100 people you must know in Asia" in 2006. In the same year, Le Prestige magazine named him in their "Top 40 under 40" list.

In 2008, Tiger Tales, the official magazine of Tiger Airways, mentioned him in their "annual list of trail-blazers across Asia and Australia". In 2012, he was listed in Conde Nast's Brides UK's "Top 20 Extremely Talented Destination Wedding Photographers in the World".

Personal life
Chan is married to Shirlyn Lim, a chartered accountant,.

References

External links
 

Malaysian photographers
Malaysian people of Chinese descent
1978 births
Portrait photographers
Wedding photographers
People from Kuala Lumpur
Living people
Malaysian businesspeople
Malaysian writers